Kataka may refer to:
 Kataka (city), the former capital and city of state Odisha, India
 Kataka (wasp), a wasp genus in the subfamily Encyrtinae
 Kataka (film), a 2017 multilingual film by Ravi Basrur

See also
Kadaka (disambiguation)